Tanka Prasad Acharya formed a government on 27 January 1956 after being appointed as prime minister by King Mahendra. The cabinet was expanded in February 1957 to add more deputy ministers.

Acharya resigned on 26 July 1957 after informing the king that he could not hold the scheduled elections in November of the same year and was replaced by Kunwar Inderjit Singh on the same day.

Cabinets

January 1956–February 1957

February 1957–July 1957

References 

1956 in Nepal
Cabinet of Nepal
Cabinets established in 1956
Cabinets disestablished in 1957
1956 establishments in Nepal
1957 disestablishments in Nepal